Margaret Armstrong Beckman (1925-February 28, 2008) was a Canadian librarian who was best known for her expertise in library design and catalogue automation. She was named Librarian of the Year by the Association of College and Research Libraries 1986.

Early life and education
Beckman was born in Hartford, Connecticut in 1925. She graduated from Waterloo College (since renamed Wilfrid Laurier University), in 1946 with a Bachelor of Arts. She went on to complete a Bachelor of Library Science at the University of Toronto in 1949 and a Master of Library Science from the same school in 1969.

Career
Early on in her career Beckman was turned down for a job at the London Public Library because of a rule against employing married women. She eventually landed a job at the University of Western Ontario where women were expected to vacate their positions before the fourth month of a pregnancy. A supervisor allowed her to continue working for an additional three months provided she stay in the basement, out of sight. She later worked at the University of Waterloo serving as the head of cataloguing (1959-1964) and director of technical services (1964-1966).

Beckman joined the University of Guelph Library in 1966. She played an active role in the planning of the school's McLaughlin Library working closely with the building architects. Beckman also played an integral role in pushing forward automation efforts at the library and was recognized as a leader in the field of automated catalogues. She developed CODOC, a unified system for categorizing government documents, as part of her Masters thesis based on work undertaken at the Library. Beckman was named Chief Librarian in 1971 and was the only woman to hold such a position in Ontario at the time. She served in the role until 1984 at which point she was the school's Executive Director of information technology.

Beckman was named Librarian of the Year by the Association of College and Research Libraries in 1986. She received the award in recognition of her "authority  in  the  areas  of  library management, automation and building design."

Beyond her academic library work, Beckman served on the Waterloo Public Library Board from 1960 to 1968. Early on in her tenure she called into question the city's commitment to children given the absence of services aimed at providing access to library books by way of mobile or on-site librarians at schools. She also caused a stir by commenting on the quality of popular books series like Nancy Drew and the Hardy Boys. She believed that Bobbsey Twins represented inferior writing reflective of the type of books to be avoided when purchasing on a limited budget.

Beckman died in Waterloo, Ontario on February 28, 2008.

Select publications

Articles

Books

References

Canadian librarians
1925 births
2008 deaths
University of Toronto alumni
American emigrants to Canada
Wilfrid Laurier University alumni
Canadian women librarians